Tom Sawyer is a 1930 American pre-Code comedy-drama film directed by John Cromwell and starring Jackie Coogan. The screenplay by Grover Jones, William Slavens McNutt, and Sam Mintz is based on the 1876 novel The Adventures of Tom Sawyer by Mark Twain.

The film was the third screen adaptation of the Twain novel, following silent versions released in 1907 and 1917. The picture was made on location at the Paramount Ranch in Agoura, California.

A sequel, Huckleberry Finn, directed by Norman Taurog and featuring most of the Tom Sawyer cast, was released the following year.

Plot
After arguing with his sweetheart, Becky Thatcher, Tom Sawyer seeks solace from his friend Huck Finn, who tells him about a mysterious cure for warts that requires them to visit the local cemetery at midnight. While there they witness a murder committed by Injun Joe, who convinces Muff Potter, who also was there but in an inebriated state, that he is guilty of the crime. Tom and Huck promise each other they will not divulge what they have seen.

When Tom is caught lying about stealing his half-brother Sid's crabapples, his Aunt Polly punishes him by making him whitewash the fence on a Saturday morning. The boy leads his friends to believe he is enjoying the task, and before long they are giving him their treasures in exchange for the privilege of joining in the fun.

Together with Huck and Joe Harper, Tom runs away from home to become a pirate. The three set off on a raft to Jacksons Island in the Mississippi River, where they remain for three days. Upon returning home, Tom discovers it was thought the three had drowned, and the boys attend their own funeral service at the church.

At Muff Potter's trial, Tom admits the truth about the murder, but Injun Joe manages to escape. While attending the school picnic near a cavern, Tom and Becky decide to explore it and get lost. As they try to find their way out, they stumble upon Injun Joe and a chest of gold. While angrily pursuing the two children, he falls into a crevasse and is killed. Huck finds Tom and Becky and leads them to safety, together with the treasure.

Cast
 Jackie Coogan as Tom Sawyer
 Junior Durkin as Huckleberry Finn
 Mitzi Green as Becky Thatcher
 Lucien Littlefield as Schoolteacher 
 Tully Marshall as Muff Potter
 Clara Blandick as Aunt Polly
 Mary Jane Irving as Mary 
 Ethel Wales as Mrs. Harper
 Dick Winslow as Joe Harper
 Jackie Searl as Sid
 Jane Darwell as Widow Douglas
 Charles Stevens as Injun Joe
 Charles Sellon as Minister 
 Lon Poff as Judge Thatcher

Critical reception
Mordaunt Hall of The New York Times said of the film, "It is an extraordinarily faithful conception of the book, and while there are of necessity certain omissions and other parts that receive but scant attention, the main incidents are included in a detailed fashion. It is wonderfully interesting to see Mark Twain's characters come to the talking screen, for if there are minor discrepancies, they are unimportant . . . Jackie Coogan's Tom Sawyer is excellent . . . In fact, the whole cast is unusually competent. Mr. Cromwell's direction is imaginative and restrained. The result is that this picture is one of the few that can be seen with appreciation and enjoyment, even immediately after reading the book over again."

However, this version was eventually superseded only eight years later by David O. Selznick's 1938 Technicolor remake of the novel, which, true to Selznick's legendary fastidiousness,  boasted not only better performances but a far more cinematic style than the fixed-camera early talkie look of the original. The cave sequence in the 1938 version is noted for being one of the most terrifying sequences in a family motion picture, with Becky Thatcher (Ann Gillis) toppling over into hysteria after the death of Injun Joe (Victor Jory).

Sequels
Coogan and Durkin reprised their roles as Tom and Huck in Huckleberry Finn and the box office success of the two pictures led Paramount Pictures to announce Tom Sawyer, Detective and Tom Sawyer Abroad would be the next films in the series. But in April 1931, Variety reported both projects were being postponed for a year because the studio was concerned about having too many children's films in the marketplace. Tom Sawyer Abroad was never produced, but Paramount did film Tom Sawyer, Detective in 1938 with Billy Cook as Tom and Donald O'Connor as Huck.

References

External links
 
 
 
 The AFI Catalog of Feature Films:..Tom Sawyer
 Tom Sawyer on dvd

1930 films
American comedy-drama films
Films based on The Adventures of Tom Sawyer
Films directed by John Cromwell
American black-and-white films
Paramount Pictures films
Films based on American novels
Films set in the 19th century
1930 comedy-drama films
1930s American films